The Hamlyn Lectures are a series of public lectures in England, Scotland, Wales and Northern Ireland given annually on a legal topic. The lectures have been given every year since 1949.

History 
The Hamlyn Trust was established in 1948 by the will of Miss Emma Warburton Hamlyn in memory of her father, a solicitor and JP in Torquay. The trust was to furtheramong the Common People of this Country of the knowledge of the Comparative Jurisprudence and the Ethnology of the Chief European countries including our own and the circumstances of the growth of such Jurisprudence to the intent that the Common People of our Country may realise the privileges which in law and custom they enjoy in comparison with other European Peoples and realising and appreciating such privileges may recognize the responsibilities and obligations attaching to them.Initially there was doubt as to whether the trust was valid, but the High Court approved a scheme for the administration of the trust in 1948, which followed closely the wording of the will.

List of Hamlyn Lectures

References

British lecture series
1949 establishments in the United Kingdom
Recurring events established in 1949